Oreta obtusa is a moth in the family Drepanidae. It was described by Francis Walker in 1855. It is found in India, China, Myanmar and Indonesia.

The length of the forewings is 18–20 mm for males and 22–23 mm for females. No other species of the genus, except for Oreta brunnea, has a large dark spot near the outer margin of the hindwings.

Subspecies 
Oreta obtusa is divided into the following subspecies:

 Oreta obtusa obtusa (northern India)
 Oreta obtusa aequitermen Watson, 1961 (Malaya, Sumatra, Sulawesi)
 Oreta obtusa dejeani Watson, 1967 (China: Hainan, Guangxi, Sichuan, Tibet)
 Oreta obtusa javae Watson, 1961 (Java, Bali)
 Oreta obtusa speciosa (Bryk, 1943) (north-eastern Burma, China: Fujian, Sichuan)

References 

Moths described in 1855
Drepaninae